Director's Cut is the ninth studio album by English singer-songwriter Kate Bush, released on 16 May 2011. It contains no new material, consisting of songs from her earlier albums The Sensual World (1989) and The Red Shoes (1993) which have been remixed and restructured, three of which were re-recorded completely. It was Bush's first album release since 2005's Aerial and the first on her own record label, Fish People.

Bush wrote all of the songs and lyrics with the exception of lines borrowed from James Joyce. The album has received mostly positive critical reviews. Praise has appeared in various publications such as AllMusic and The Scotsman.

Overview 
Released in May 2011, the album features four tracks taken from The Sensual World (1989) and seven from The Red Shoes (1993) which have been re-recorded while retaining most of the original instrumentation.

Regarding the entirely new lyrics to the song "The Sensual World", now re-titled "Flower of the Mountain", Bush said this: "Originally when I wrote the song "The Sensual World" I had used text from the end of Ulysses by James Joyce, put to a piece of music I had written. When I asked for permission to use the text I was refused, which was disappointing. I then wrote my own lyrics for the song although I felt that the original idea had been more interesting.  Well, I'm not James Joyce am I? When I came to work on this project I thought I would ask for permission again and this time they said yes.  It is now re-titled "Flower of the Mountain" and I am delighted that I have had the chance to fulfill the original concept. For some time I have felt that I wanted to revisit tracks from these two albums and that they could benefit from having new life breathed into them. Lots of work had gone into the two original albums and now these songs have another layer of work woven into their fabric. I think of this as a new album."

All the lead vocals on Director's Cut and some of the backing vocals have been entirely re-recorded, with some of the songs transposed to a lower key to accommodate Bush's matured voice. Additionally, the drum tracks have been reconceived and re-recorded, with some of the tracks featuring Steve Gadd. Bassist Danny Thompson also appears and, on backing vocals, Mica Paris.  Three songs have been completely re-recorded: "This Woman's Work", "Rubberband Girl" and "Moments of Pleasure".

Director's Cut is available as a digital album, a standard CD in a case-bound book, a deluxe version ("Collector's Edition"), consisting of a box set including Director's Cut, The Sensual World and The Red Shoes (re-mastered from digital to analogue), and two-disc vinyl. Director's Cut was recorded using analogue equipment. Bush stated in an interview for BBC radio that she never liked the "hard-edged sound" of the digitally recorded The Red Shoes and feels both the new recordings of the songs from this album and the re-mastered The Red Shoes have a "warmer, fuller sound."

The album peaked at number two on the UK Albums Chart (matching the chart peak of both The Sensual World and The Red Shoes) and although it fell swiftly down the chart after its first week it has sold consistently and has since been certified silver in the UK. The album also charted in a number of other countries, including a number-four entry in the Irish charts, and also reached the top 10 in the Netherlands and Norway.

Director's Cut versions of "Lily" and "Top of the City" were performed live for the first time in Before the Dawn 2014 series of concerts.

Singles
The only single to be released from the album was "Deeper Understanding", originally the sixth track of The Sensual World. Its lyrics describe a relationship between a lonely person and a computer which has replaced human companionship.
The video was released through her official YouTube account. The song features a newly recorded main vocal by Bush, and the voice of her son Albert on the chorus. The single, upon its initial release as a digital download, charted in the UK at No. 87.

Critical reception

Critical reception for the album was mostly positive, with most reviewers acknowledging the confusion surrounding the release of this unique revisitation of old songs. At Metacritic, which assigns a normalised rating out of 100 to reviews from mainstream critics, the album received an average score of 80, based on 22 reviews, which indicates "generally favorable reviews". Simon Price of The Independent noted: "Director's Cut was greeted with reactions ranging between disappointment, bafflement and ridicule, before anyone had heard a note... taken on its own merits, however, there's plenty to enjoy".

Specifically, Fiona Shephard of The Scotsman gave Director's Cut a 4-star review, writing: "Ever the perfectionist, Kate Bush has revisited earlier songs, the first-time recordings of which didn't reflect her original vision. The resulting revamps are satisfying, rounded – and occasionally bizarre." Thom Jurek of AllMusic stated that he found the release "deeply engaging and satisfying" and particularly stated that since Bush has "her own world-class recording studio" where "she's kept up with technology" that it shows positively in the details added to the remade songs.

Track listing

All songs written by Kate Bush except "Flower of the Mountain" lyrics by James Joyce.

 "Flower of the Mountain" – 5:15 
 "Song of Solomon" – 4:45 
 "Lily" – 4:05 
 "Deeper Understanding" – 6:33 
 "The Red Shoes" – 4:58 
 "This Woman's Work" – 6:30 
 "Moments of Pleasure" – 6:32 
 "Never Be Mine" – 5:05 
 "Top of the City" – 4:24 
 "And So Is Love" – 4:21 
 "Rubberband Girl" – 4:37

Personnel 
 Kate Bush – vocals, keyboards, backing vocals, piano
 Paddy Bush – mandola, flute, whistle, backing vocals
 Steve Gadd – drums
 John Giblin, Eberhard Weber, Danny Thompson – bass guitar
 Danny McIntosh, Eric Clapton – guitar
 Gary Brooker – Hammond organ
 Albert McIntosh – programming, backing vocals
 Brendan Power – harmonica
 Ed Rowntree, Mica Paris, Jacob Thorn, Michael Wood, Jevan Johnson Booth – backing vocals

Charts

Weekly charts

Year-end charts

Certifications

See also

 "Deeper Understanding"

References

2011 albums
Alternative rock albums by English artists
Kate Bush albums